Floriano Vanzo (born 28 April 1994) is a Belgian professional footballer who plays as a winger for Belgian National Division 1 club RAAL La Louvière.

Club career
Vanzo signed a two year contract with A.F.C. Tubize in 2011. He made his debut in 2011–12 Belgian Second Division.

In the summer of 2012 Vanzo was signed by Italian club Parma F.C. after an agreement between Tubize and Parma was formed in November 2012. His transfer was documented to Lega Serie A on 4 July 2012, but was completed six months later, on 18 January 2013.

Vanzo signed a two-year contract with the Italian side  and made his debut for the reserve team on the next day. He was selected for the 32 man squad for the pre-season training of Parma's first team.

On 1 July 2013, Vanzo left the reserve team to join Slovenian club Gorica, along with Bright Addae, Daniele Bazzoffia, Uroš Celcer, Massimo Coda, Alex Cordaz, Sebestyén Ihrig-Farkas, Alen Jogan, Gianluca Lapadula and Fabio Lebran. The deals were finalized on 12 July. His loan contract with Gorica was terminated in late January.

On 8 January 2014, Vanzo returned to Belgium with Club Brugge. He was a test player for the reserve team. After a successful trial, the club later offered Vanzo a three-year deal.

On 22 January 2015, Vanzo was signed by Waasland-Beveren.

Vanzo joined hometown club RAAL La Louvière on 15 April 2022 after a stint in Romania where he played for Politehnica Iași and Academica Clinceni.

Personal life
Vanzo was born in La Louvière, Belgium to Italian parents.

References

External links
 
 

1994 births
Living people
Belgian footballers
Belgium under-21 international footballers
A.F.C. Tubize players
Parma Calcio 1913 players
ND Gorica players
Club Brugge KV players
S.K. Beveren players
R.E. Virton players
FC Politehnica Iași (2010) players
LPS HD Clinceni players
RAAL La Louvière players
Belgian Pro League players
Challenger Pro League players
Slovenian PrvaLiga players
Belgian National Division 1 players
Association football forwards
Belgian expatriate footballers
Expatriate footballers in Slovenia
Belgian expatriate sportspeople in Slovenia
Expatriate footballers in Romania
Belgian expatriate sportspeople in Romania
Belgian people of Italian descent
People from La Louvière
Footballers from Hainaut (province)